Ahmed Rabee El Sheikh (born June 1, 1993) is an Egyptian professional footballer who currently plays as a goalkeeper for the Egyptian club Smouha.

References

External links 
 Ahmed Rabee El Sheikh at KOOORA.com
 Ahmed Rabee El Sheikh at FilGoal.com

Living people
1993 births
Egyptian footballers
Association football goalkeepers
Tanta SC players
Smouha SC players